The 1945 Allen Yellow Jackets football team was an American football team that represented Allen University of Columbia, South Carolina, in the Southern Intercollegiate Athletic Conference (SIAC) during the 1945 college football season.

Schedule

References

Allen
Allen Yellow Jackets football seasons
Allen Yellow Jackets football